L'Anse-au-Loup is a town in the Canadian province of Newfoundland and Labrador. The town had a population of 692 in the Canada 2021 Census, up from 550 in 2011. In the Canada 2006 Census, there were 593 inhabitants. Common Surnames are Barney, Belben, Cabot, Earle, Linstead, Normore, O'Brien, Ryland.

The town is located along Route 510 in Labrador, between Forteau and L'Anse-au-Diable. The town was incorporated in 1975. The first mayor was Reginald O'Brien Sr.

Demographics 

See also
 List of cities and towns in Newfoundland and Labrador
 Wolf Cove, Newfoundland and Labrador

References

Towns in Newfoundland and Labrador
Populated places in Labrador